Warren Dockter (born 1982) is an author and historian. He was a Research Fellow at Clare Hall, University of Cambridge and a lecturer at Aberystwyth University in International Politics.

Dockter is a former member of the council of the British Institute at Ankara.  Dockter now serves as the President and CEO of the East Tennessee Historical Society in Knoxville, TN.

Biography
Warren Dockter is a graduate of the University of Tennessee and gained his PhD at the University of Nottingham. His book Churchill and the Islamic World: Orientalism, Empire and Diplomacy in the Middle East (2015) challenged notions surrounding Winston Churchill's Islamophobia. According to Dockter, Churchill's often quoted criticism of Islam was written  during a time of a fundamentalist revolt in Sudan and this statement does not reflect his full views of Islam as a religion, which were "often paradoxical and complex." He could be critical but at times "romanticized" the Islamic world; he exhibited great "respect, understanding and magnanimity." Churchill had a fascination of Islam and Islamic civilization. Winston Churchill's future sister-in-law expressed concerns about his fascination by stating, "[p]lease don't become converted to Islam; I have noticed in your disposition a tendency to orientalism." However, Dockter also asserted that Churchill "never seriously considered converting" to Islam.

Dockter worked  with Boris Johnson as his research assistant for the book The Churchill Factor: How One Man made History. He was not credited, but was thanked in its acknowledgments.

Publications

External links
 http://www.hist.cam.ac.uk/directory/dr-warren-dokter
 http://www.clarehall.cam.ac.uk/our-people/warren-dockter

References 

Academics of the University of Cambridge
Living people
Fellows of Clare Hall, Cambridge
1982 births